Kurkjian or Kurkdjian (Armenian: Քուրքջյան) is an Armenian surname that may refer to

Francis Kurkdjian (born 1969), Armenian perfumer and businessman
Ohannes Kurkdjian (1851–1903), Armenian photographer
Stephen Kurkjian, American journalist 
Tim Kurkjian (born 1956), American Major League Baseball analyst, cousin of Stephen
Vahan Kurkjian (1863–1961), Armenian author, historian, teacher, and community leader
Jon Kurkjian (born 1981), American Plastic Surgeon
Arthur Haroutioun Kurkjian (born 1919), French Designer
Hadrien Kurkjian (born 1988), French Fundamental Physics Research Scientist
Mae Kurkjian (born 1992), French Policy and Advocacy Manager
Anoushka Kurkjian (born 1979), British Director, Middle East Business Intelligence
Rodrigue Kurkjian (born 1957), French Publisher, American chef, food manufacturer and distributor 

Armenian-language surnames